This article contains lists of countries ranked by ethnic and cultural diversity level.

Methodology
The lists are commonly used in economics literature to compare the levels of ethnic, cultural, linguistic and religious fractionalization in different countries. 

Fractionalization is the probability that two individuals drawn randomly from the country's groups are not from the same group (ethnic, religious, or whatever the criterion is). Note that in Fearon's analysis, only groups containing over one percent of the country's population were considered.  This limit made Papua New Guinea (PNG) an interesting oddity; as none of its thousands of groups included more than one percent of the population, it was considered to have zero groups and thus have a perfect fractionalization score of 1.

The two lists have been described by Alesina and Ferrara as follows:
"Fearon and Alesina et al. have compiled various measures of ethnic heterogeneity which try to tackle the fact that the difference amongst groups manifests itself in different ways in different places. The two classifications are constructed differently. Alesina et al. do not take a stand on what ethnicity (or language or religion) are more salient than others and adopt the country breakdown suggested by original sources, mainly the Encyclopædia Britannica. Fearon instead is trying to construct the 'right list' of ethnic groups which 'depends on what people in the country identify as the most socially relevant ethnic groupings'. This approach has the advantage of being closer to what the theory would want and the disadvantage of having to make judgement calls (or adopt others' judgement calls) about what is the 'right list'."

List based on Fearon's analysis
In the Fearon list, ethnic fractionalization is approximated by a measure of similarity between languages, varying from 1 = the population speaks two or more unrelated languages to 0 = the entire population speaks the same language. This index of cultural diversity is biased towards linguistic variations as opposed to genetic diversity and other variations.

References

Cultural geography
Demographic lists
Diversity
Multiculturalism